Sylvester Cleofoster Joseph (born September 5, 1978) is a West Indian cricketer who has played in five Tests and 13 ODIs, from 2000 to 2005. He captained the West Indies in one of those ODI games due to the more experienced players being unavailable courtesy of contract disputes. In West Indian domestic cricket he plays for the Leeward Islands.

Against the West Indies B in the Busta Cup of 2001/02, Joseph converted his maiden first class ton for the Leeward Islands into a double century, finishing with 211 not out. 

A right-handed middle order batsman, Joseph first joined the national team when they toured Australia in 2000–01. He did not play a Test but did take part in the ODI series, albeit without any success. 

In July 2004 he toured England and scored a century against a Sri Lankan A side. He followed it up with 68 in the second innings to put himself in contention for the Tests. After not being selected for the first two Tests he made his debut in the 3rd Test at Old Trafford. He came into the side as a direct replacement for Devon Smith and as a result was asked to open the batting. He made 45 in the first innings and 15 in the second. Opening the batting again in the following Test he failed to impress and had to wait until the tour of Sri Lanka a year later to get a recall. 

Joseph is now a regular for West Indies A side and is the current captain of the side. In 2006 he made two centuries for them, both against England A.

External links
 

1978 births
Living people
Leeward Islands cricketers
West Indies One Day International cricketers
West Indies Test cricketers
Antigua and Barbuda cricketers
West Indian cricket captains
Commonwealth Games competitors for Antigua and Barbuda
Cricketers at the 1998 Commonwealth Games
People from Saint George Parish, Antigua and Barbuda